The tarot (first known as trionfi and later as tarocchi or tarocks) is a pack of playing cards, used from at least the mid-15th century in various parts of Europe to play card games such as  Tarocchini. From their Italian roots, tarot playing cards spread to most of Europe evolving into a family of games that includes German Grosstarok and modern games such as French Tarot and Austrian Königrufen. In the late 18th century, French occultists made elaborate, but unsubstantiated, claims about their history and meaning, leading to the emergence of custom decks for use in divination via tarot card reading and cartomancy. Thus there are two distinct types of tarot pack: those used for card games and those used for divination. However, some older patterns, such as the Tarot de Marseille, originally intended for playing card games, are occasionally used for cartomancy.

Like the common playing cards, tarot has four suits which vary by region: French suits are used in western, central and eastern Europe, Latin suits in southern Europe. Each suit has 14 cards: ten pip cards numbering from one (or Ace) to ten, and four face cards (King, Queen, Knight, and Jack/Knave/Page).  In addition, the tarot has a separate 21-card trump suit and a single card known as the Fool. Depending on the game, the Fool may act as the top trump or may be played to avoid following suit. These tarot cards are still used throughout much of Europe to play conventional card games.

Among English-speaking countries where these games are not widely played, only specially designed cartomantic tarot cards are readily available and they are used primarily for novelty and divinatory purposes. The early French occultists claimed that tarot cards had esoteric links to ancient Egypt, the Kabbalah, Indic Tantra, or the I Ching, and these claims have been frequently repeated by authors on card divination. However, scholarly research has demonstrated that tarot cards were invented in northern Italy in the mid-15th century and confirmed that there is no historical evidence of any significant use of tarot cards for divination until the late 18th century. In fact, historians have described western views of the Tarot pack as "the subject of the most successful propaganda campaign ever launched... An entire false history and false interpretation of the Tarot pack was concocted by the occultists; and it is all but universally believed".

In the occult tradition, tarot cards are referred to as 'arcana'; with the Fool and 21 trumps being termed the Major Arcana and the suit cards the Minor Arcana. However, these terms are not used by players of tarot card games.

Tarot cards, then known as tarocchi, first appeared in Ferrara and Milan in northern Italy, with a Fool and 21 trumps (then called trionfi) being added to the standard Italian pack of four suits: batons, coins, cups and swords. Scholarship has established that the early European cards were probably based on the Egyptian Mamluk deck which followed the invention of paper from Asia into Western Europe and was invented in or before the 14th century. By the late 1300's Europeans were producing their own cards, the earliest patterns being based on the Mamluk deck but with variations to the suit symbols and court cards.

Distribution 
The use of tarot playing cards was at one time widespread across the whole of Europe with the exceptions of the British Isles and the Iberian Peninsula. Having fallen into decline by the 20th century, in recent decades they have experienced a renaissance in some countries and regions. For example, French Tarot was largely confined to Provence in the 18th century, but took off in the 1950s to such an extent that, in 1973, the French Tarot Association (Fédération Française de Tarot) was formed and French Tarot itself is now the second most popular card game in France. Tarock games like Königrufen have experienced significant growth in Austria where international tournaments are held with other nations especially from eastern Europe that still play such games, including Hungary, Romania, Slovakia and Slovenia. Denmark appears to be the only Scandinavian country that still plays tarot games, Danish Tarok being a derivative of historical German Grosstarock. The game of Cego is growing in popularity again in the south German region of Baden. Italy continues to play regionally popular games with their distinctive Tarot packs. These include: Ottocento in Bologna and Sicilian Tarocchi in parts of Sicily. Meanwhile Troccas and Troggu are still played locally in parts of Switzerland.

History

Playing cards first entered Europe in the late 14th century, but the origin is unknown. The first records date to 1367 in Berne and they appear to have spread very rapidly across the whole of Europe, as may be seen from the records, mainly of card games being banned. Little is known about the appearance and number of these cards; the only significant information being provided by a text by John of Rheinfelden in 1377 from Freiburg im Breisgau, who, in addition to other versions describes the basic pack as containing the still-current 4 suits of 13 cards, the courts usually being the King, Ober and Unter ("marshals"), although Dames and Queens were already known by then.

One early pattern of playing cards that evolved was one with the suits of Batons or Clubs, Coins, Swords, and Cups. These suits are still used in traditional Italian, Spanish and Portuguese playing card decks, and are also used in modern (occult) tarot divination cards that first appeared in the late 18th century.

The first documented tarot decks were recorded between 1440 and 1450 in Milan, Ferrara, Florence and Bologna when additional trump cards with allegorical illustrations were added to the common four-suit pack. These new decks were called carte da trionfi, triumph cards, and the additional cards known simply as trionfi, which became "trumps" in English. The earliest documentation of trionfi is found in a written statement in the court records of Florence, in 1440, regarding the transfer of two decks to Sigismondo Pandolfo Malatesta.

The oldest surviving tarot cards are the 15 or so Visconti-Sforza tarot decks painted in the mid-15th century for the rulers of the Duchy of Milan. A lost tarot-like pack was commissioned by Duke Filippo Maria Visconti and described by Martiano da Tortona probably between 1418 and 1425, since the painter he mentions, Michelino da Besozzo, returned to Milan in 1418, while Martiano himself died in 1425. He described a 60-card deck with 16 cards having images of the Roman gods and suits depicting four kinds of birds. The 16 cards were regarded as "trumps" since in 1449 Jacopo Antonio Marcello recalled that the now deceased duke had invented a novum quoddam et exquisitum triumphorum genus, or "a new and exquisite kind of triumphs". Other early decks that also showcased classical motifs include the Sola-Busca and Boiardo-Viti decks of the 1490s.

In Florence, an expanded deck called Minchiate was used. This deck of 97 cards includes astrological symbols and the four elements, as well as traditional tarot motifs.

Although a Dominican preacher inveighed against the evil inherent in cards (chiefly owing to their use in gambling) in a sermon in the 15th century, no routine condemnations of tarot were found during its early history.

Because the earliest tarot cards were hand-painted, the number of the decks produced is thought to have been small. It was only after the invention of the printing press that mass production of cards became possible. The expansion of tarot outside of Italy, first to France and Switzerland, occurred during the Italian Wars. The most prominent tarot deck version used in these two countries was the Tarot of Marseilles of Milanese origin.

Etymology

The word "tarot" and German Tarock derive from the Italian Tarocchi, the origin of which is uncertain, although taroch was used as a synonym for foolishness in the late 15th and early 16th centuries. The decks were known exclusively as Trionfi during the fifteenth century. The new name first appeared in Brescia around 1502 as Tarocho. During the 16th century, a new game played with a standard deck but sharing a very similar name (Trionfa) was quickly becoming popular. This coincided with the older game being renamed tarocchi. In modern Italian, the singular term is Tarocco, which, as a noun, refers to a cultivar of blood orange. The attribute Tarocco and the verb Taroccare are used regionally to indicate that something is fake or forged. This meaning is directly derived from the tarocchi game as played in Italy, in which tarocco indicates a card that can be played in place of another card.

Playing card decks 

The original purpose of tarot cards was to play games. A very cursory explanation of rules for a tarot-like deck is given in a manuscript by Martiano da Tortona before 1425. Vague descriptions of game play or game terminology follow for the next two centuries until the earliest known complete description of rules for a French variant in 1637. The game of tarot has many regional variations. Tarocchini has survived in Bologna and there are still others played in Piedmont and Sicily, but in Italy the game is generally less popular than elsewhere.

The 18th century saw tarot's greatest revival, during which it became one of the most popular card games in Europe, played everywhere except Ireland and Britain, the Iberian peninsula, and the Ottoman Balkans. French tarot experienced another revival beginning in the 1970s and France has the strongest tarot gaming community. Regional tarot games—often known as tarock, tarok, or tarokk—are widely played in central Europe within the borders of the former Austro-Hungarian empire.

Italian-suited decks

These were the oldest form of tarot deck to be made, being first devised in the 15th century in northern Italy. Three decks of this category are still used to play certain games:
 The Tarocco Piemontese consists of the four suits of swords, batons, cups and coins, each headed by a king, queen, cavalier and jack, followed by the pip cards for a total of 78 cards. Trump 20 outranks 21 in most games and the Fool is numbered 0 despite not being a trump.
 The Swiss 1JJ Tarot is similar, but replaces the Pope with Jupiter, the Popess with Juno, and the Angel with the Judgement. The trumps rank in numerical order and the Tower is known as the House of God. The cards are not reversible like the Tarocco Piemontese.
 The Tarocco Bolognese omits numeral cards two to five in plain suits, leaving it with 62 cards, and has somewhat different trumps, not all of which are numbered and four of which are equal in rank. It has a different graphical design than the two above as it was not derived from the Tarot of Marseilles.

Italo-Portuguese-suited deck
The Tarocco Siciliano is the only deck to use the so-called Portuguese suit system which uses Spanish pips but intersects them like Italian pips. Some of the trumps are different such as the lowest trump, Miseria (destitution). It omits the Two and Three of coins, and numerals one to four in clubs, swords and cups: it thus has 64 cards but the ace of coins is not used, being the bearer of the former stamp tax. The cards are quite small and not reversible.[9]

French-suited decks
The illustrations of French-suited tarot trumps depart considerably from the older Italian-suited design, abandoning the Renaissance allegorical motifs. With the exception of novelty decks, French-suited tarot cards are almost exclusively used for card games. The first generation of French-suited tarots depicted scenes of animals on the trumps and were thus called "Tiertarock" ('Tier' being German for 'animal') appeared around 1740. Around 1800, a greater variety of decks were produced, mostly with genre art or veduta. The German states used to produce a variety of 78-card tarot packs, originally using Italian suits, but later switching to French suited cards; some were imported to France. Today, there are only two: both are French-suited patterns of Cego packs - the Cego Adler pack manufactured by ASS Altenburger and one with genre scenes by F.X. Schmid, which may reflect the mainstream German cards of the 19th century. Current French-suited tarot decks come in these patterns:

 Industrie und Glück – the Industrie und Glück ("Diligence and Fortune") genre art tarock deck of Central Europe uses Roman numerals for the trumps. It is sold with 54 cards; the 5 to 10 of the red suits and the 1 to 6 of the black suits are removed. There are 3 patterns – Types A, B and C – of which Type C has become the standard, whereas Types B and C appear in limited editions or specials.
Tarot Nouveau – also called the Tarot Bourgeois – has a 78-card pack. It is commonly used for tarot games in France and for Danish Tarok in Denmark. It is also sometimes used in Germany to play Cego. Its genre art trumps use Arabic numerals in corner indices.
 Adler-Cego – this is an animal tarot that is used in the Upper Rhine valley and neighbouring mountain regions such as the Black Forest or the Vosges It has 54 cards organized in the same fashion as the Industrie und Glück packs. Its trumps use Arabic numerals but within centered indices.
 Schmid-Cego - this pack by F.X. Schmid is of the Bourgeois Tarot type and has genre scenes similar to those of the Tarot Nouveau, but the Arabic numerals are centred as in the Adler-Cego pack.

German 'Tarock' cards 
From the late 18th century, the south German states manufactured German-suited packs labelled 'Taroc', 'Tarock' or 'Deutsch-Tarok'. Today these survive as 'Schafkopf/Tarock' packs of the Bavarian and Franconian pattern. These are not true tarot packs, but standard 36-card German-suited decks for games like German Tarok, Bauerntarock, Württemberg Tarock and Bavarian Tarock. Until the 1980s there were also Tarock packs in the Württemberg pattern. There are 36 cards; the pip cards ranging from 6 to 10, Under Knave (Unter), Over Knave (Ober), King, and Ace. These use Ace-Ten ranking, like Klaverjas, where Ace is the highest followed by 10, King, Ober, Unter, then 9 to 6. The heart suit is the default trump suit. The Bavarian pack is also used to play Schafkopf by excluding the Sixes.

Spanish-suited decks
Spanish-suited playing cards have four suits, and a deck is usually made up of 40 or 48 cards (or even up to 52 in the oldest versions). It is categorized as a Latin-suited deck and has strong similarities with the Italian-suited deck as both were derived directly from the Mamluk cards. The oldest mentions date back to the 14th century making it one of the oldest in Europe.

Spanish-suited cards are used in Spain, southern Italy, parts of France, Hispanic America, North Africa, and the Philippines. The four suits are bastos (clubs), oros (literally "golds", that is, golden coins), copas (cups) and espadas (swords). However, the suits vary in style depending on the region and time. The following patterns (and their suits) are derived from the oldest Spanish-suited deck: the castillian pattern, the Spanish national pattern (old Catalan pattern), the new Catalan pattern, Franco-Spanish pattern (Suit Piacentine and Suit Romagnole), Madrid pattern (Suit Sicilian and Suit Neapolitan), Sardinian pattern and the extinct Portuguese pattern.

Like the Italian-suited tarot, the deck is used for both game playing and cartomancy. The Spanish deck has been considered part of the occult in many Latin American countries as well as being widely for card games, including in Spain.

Cartomancy 

The earliest evidence of a tarot deck used for cartomancy comes from an anonymous manuscript from around 1750 which documents rudimentary divinatory meanings for the cards of the Tarocco Bolognese. The popularization of esoteric tarot started with Antoine Court and Jean-Baptiste Alliette (Etteilla) in Paris during the 1780s, using the Tarot of Marseilles. French tarot players abandoned the Marseilles tarot in favor of the Tarot Nouveau around 1900, with the result that the Marseilles pattern is now used mostly by cartomancers.

Etteilla was the first to produce a bespoke tarot deck specifically designed for occult purposes around 1789. In keeping with the unsubstantiated belief that such cards were derived from the Book of Thoth, Etteilla's tarot contained themes related to ancient Egypt.

The 78-card tarot deck used by esotericists has two distinct parts:

 The Major Arcana (greater secrets) consists of 22 cards without suits. Their names and numbers vary, but in a typical scheme, the names are: 
The Magician, The High Priestess, The Empress, The Emperor, The Hierophant, The Lovers, The Chariot, Strength, The Hermit, Wheel of Fortune, Justice, The Hanged Man, Death, Temperance, The Devil, The Tower, The Star, The Moon, The Sun, Judgement, The World, and The Fool. Cards from The Magician to The World are numbered in Roman numerals from I to XXI, while The Fool is the only unnumbered card, sometimes placed at the beginning of the deck as 0, or at the end as XXII.
 The Minor Arcana (lesser secrets) consists of 56 cards, divided into four suits of 14 cards each; 
Ten numbered cards and four court cards. The court cards are the King, Queen, Knight and Page/Jack, in each of the four tarot suits. The traditional Italian tarot suits are swords, batons, coins and cups; however, in modern occult tarot decks, the suit of batons is often called wands, rods or staves; the suit of coins is often called pentacles or disks and the suit of cups is often referred to as goblets.

The terms "Major Arcana" and "Minor Arcana" were first used by Jean-Baptiste Pitois (also known as Paul Christian) and are never used in relation to tarot card games, which operate by a distinct set of rules. Some decks exist primarily as artwork, and such art decks sometimes contain only the 22 Major Arcana.

The three most common decks used in esoteric tarot are the Tarot of Marseilles, the Rider–Waite–Smith tarot deck, and the Thoth tarot deck.

Aleister Crowley, who devised the Thoth deck along with Lady Frieda Harris, stated of the tarot: "The origin of this pack of cards is very obscure. Some authorities seek to put it back as far as the ancient Egyptian Mysteries; others try to bring it forward as late as the fifteenth or even the sixteenth century ... [but] The only theory of ultimate interest about the tarot is that it is an admirable symbolic picture of the Universe, based on the data of the Holy Qabalah." However, the origin of the Tarot pack is now well documented, showing that it was invented in Italy in the early 15th century (see history section above).

Some people today use Tarot cards as a tool for self-exploration and development and some psychologists use Tarot cards as a complementary care therapy. Through Tarot cards, it is claimed that the exploration of the inner self leads to greater freedom within the individual.

Notes

References

Bibliography 
 Daynes, Daniel (2000). Le Tarot, ses règles et toutes ses variantes, Bornemann, April 2000. 
 Decker, Ronald, Thierry Depaulis and Michael Dummett. (1996). A Wicked Pack of Cards. London: Duckworth. 
 Dummett, Sir Michael (1980). The Game of Tarot. Duckworth, London.

Further reading

External links

Tarot
Playing cards
Italian Renaissance
Christian iconography
Magic symbols
Italian inventions